Gilfillan Biotic Area is a protected wetland area in Beltrami County, Minnesota.

History
Gilfillan Biotic Area may be named for Episcopal missionary and linguist Joseph Gilfillan.

Description
The Gillifan Biotic Area is an undeveloped natural area that holds an abundance of wild orchids and white spruce.

Notes

Protected areas of Beltrami County, Minnesota
Nature reserves in Minnesota